Daniel Biran Bayor is the Israeli Ambassador to the Dominican Republic with concurrent appointments to Antigua and Barbuda, Jamaica, Haiti, Dominica,  Grenada, St. Lucia, St. Vincent and the Grenadines, and Saint Kitts and Nevis.              

Bayor has a Masters in Public Health from Tel Aviv University.

References

Tel Aviv University alumni
Ambassadors of Israel to Antigua and Barbuda
Ambassadors of Israel to the Dominican Republic
Ambassadors of Israel to Jamaica
Ambassadors of Israel to Haiti
Ambassadors of Israel to Dominica
Ambassadors of Israel to Grenada
Ambassadors of Israel to Saint Lucia
Ambassadors of Israel to Saint Kitts and Nevis
Ambassadors of Israel to Saint Vincent and the Grenadines
Year of birth missing (living people)
Living people